Vitthal Tupe (born: 10 September 1940, Hadapsar, Maharashtra - death: 2 July 2004, Hadapsar) was an Indian politician. He was senior member of Nationalist Congress Party . Tupe was three time member of the Maharashtra Legislative Assembly from the Pune Cantonment constituency in Pune as member of the Janata Party. In 1998, Tupe won the Pune Lok Sabha constituency on an Indian National Congress ticket but joined the Nationalist Congress Party after Sharad Pawar left the Indian National Congress.

Positions Held 

 Member of the Maharashtra Legislative Assembly from the Pune Cantonment constituency (thrice)
 Senior member of Nationalist Congress Party

References 

Politicians from Pune
1940 births
2004 deaths
Janata Party politicians
Members of the Maharashtra Legislative Assembly
Marathi politicians
Indian National Congress politicians from Maharashtra
Nationalist Congress Party politicians from Maharashtra
India MPs 1998–1999
Lok Sabha members from Maharashtra